Bikash is a given name. Notable people with the name include:

Bikash Bhattacharjee (1940–2006), Indian painter from Kolkata in West Bengal
Bikash Ranjan Bhattacharya, Indian politician
Bikash Bista (born 1965), Director General of Central Bureau of Statistics of Nepal
Charu Bikash Chakma, Bangladeshi Chakma politician
Bikash Singh Chhetri (born 1992), footballer from Nepal
Bikash Chowdhury (1932–2005), Indian politician
Bikash Chowdhury (cricketer) (1938–2019), Indian former cricketer
Bikash Dali (born 1980), Nepalese cricketer
Bikash Jairu (born 1990), Indian professional footballer
Bikash Malla (born 1986), footballer from Nepal
Bikash Panji, Indian football Midfielder
Bikash Roy, actor in Bengali cinema
Bikash Sarkar (born 1965), Bengali poet, writer, journalist and editor
Bikash Sinha, Indian physicist, active in nuclear physics and high energy physics

See also
Bikash, a village in Kurdistan Province, Iran
Grameen Baybosa Bikash, a non-profit and non-government organization that uses microcredit as a tool for fighting poverty
Bickmarsh